NNI (Neural Network Intelligence) is a free and open-source AutoML toolkit developed by Microsoft. It is used to automate feature engineering, model compression, neural architecture search, and hyper-parameter tuning.

The source code is licensed under MIT License and available on GitHub.

See also
 Machine learning
 ML.NET

References

Further reading

External links
 
 Neural Network Intelligence - Microsoft Research

Applied machine learning
Applications of artificial intelligence
Free and open-source software
Microsoft free software
Microsoft Research
Open-source artificial intelligence
Software using the MIT license
2017 software